Chorkor Trotro is a Ghanaian comedy series which was aired on TV3. This comedy series is centered on the daily hustles of a bus driver and his conductor (referred to as "mate" in Ghana )  with blend of  drama often between the bus conductor and his passengers. The setting of this series is a bus station at Chorkor, a suburb of the Greater Accra region in Ghana, hence the title of this series being "Chorkor Trotro". The term "Trotro" is the local name for minibuses in Ghana.

Cast 
Benson Nana Yaw Oduro Boateng as Chemu
 
Prince Yawson as Baba

Ekow Jones as Wofa Sam

Ghanaian comedy television series